Pauline Laetitia Tennant, later Pauline Graham, Pauline Rumbold and Lady Rumbold (6 February 1927 – 6 December 2008) was an English actress, poet and socialite.

Family
Born into an aristocratic family, she was the daughter of David Pax Tennant and Hermione Baddeley. She was married three times, to Julian Pitt-Rivers (1946–53); Euan Douglas Graham, grandson of the fifth Duke of Montrose (from 1954-70); and then Sir Anthony Rumbold (1974–83).

Stage and screen
Tennant played on the West End stage in Ben Travers' She Followed Me About (1943) and alongside Fay Compton in No Medals (1947). She also appeared in two films: Great Day (1945, screen debut) and The Queen of Spades (1949).

In an obituary for The Independent, the writer Philip Hoare described Tennant as "a true bohemian aristocrat – a tension of qualities that were literally in her genes." During her younger years she was often seen at the bar of the prestigious Ritz, London.

Filmography

Bibliography

References

External links

1929 births
2008 deaths
English women poets
20th-century English poets
20th-century English women writers
English socialites
English film actresses
English stage actresses
20th-century English actresses
1940s in London
Wives of baronets